Luis Alberto Rogel García (born 2 April 1985) was a Chilean footballer who played as goalkeeper. 

He is remembered for his spell at Palestino.

Honours

Player
San Marcos de Arica
 Tercera División de Chile (1): 2007

Palestino
 Primera División de Chile (1): Runner-up 2008 Apertura

External links
 Rogel at Football Lineups 
 

1985 births
Living people
Chilean footballers
Coquimbo Unido footballers
Cobresal footballers
Club Deportivo Palestino footballers
Curicó Unido footballers
San Marcos de Arica footballers
Chilean Primera División players
Primera B de Chile players
Association football goalkeepers